Four-time defending champions David Wagner and Nick Taylor defeated Andrew Lapthorne and Lucas Sithole in the final, 6–0, 2–6, 6–3 to win the quad doubles wheelchair tennis title at the 2013 US Open.

The event was not held in 2012 due to a scheduling conflict with the 2012 Summer Paralympics.

Main draw

Final

References

 Main Draw

Wheelchair Quad Doubles
U.S. Open, 2013 Quad Doubles